Anders Olof Berglund (born 21 July 1948) is a Swedish arranger, composer, conductor, pianist and musician.

Career
Born in Stockholm, Berglund is best known as conductor of Melodifestivalen, the Swedish final of the Eurovision Song Contest.
He was musical director of the ESC when the event was hosted by Sweden in Malmö in 1992. In addition he also acted as one of the Swedish commentators for the 1999 Contest together with Pekka Heino.

In the 1970s he was a member of the band Blue Swede.

He composed the music of the musical SKÅL at the Maxim-theatre in 1985.

1997-2005 he was one of the team captains/pianists in the popular Swedish TV show Så ska det låta.

In Autumn 2007, Berglund arranged the music in the musical  "Sound of Music" at the Göta Lejon.

Selected Original Scores composed
1983 - Two Boys and One Girl
1988 - Gull-Pian
1989 - 1939 (film)
1990 - Nils Karlsson-Pyssling
1997 - Pippi Longstocking

References

External links
"Anders Berglund: Leader of the Band", iTunes

1948 births
Living people
Swedish composers
Swedish male composers
Eurovision Song Contest conductors
Swedish pianists
Male pianists
21st-century conductors (music)
21st-century pianists
21st-century Swedish male musicians
Blue Swede members